Pistolet-pulemet (Пистоле́т-пулемёт) means submachine gun in Russian. The name is most often used in relation to a series of weapons made by the Soviet Union which includes PPD-40, PPSh-41 and PPS-43. The letter after the PP (ПП) in the gun's designation is from the designer's name. For example, the "Sh" in PPSh stands for Shpagin (Russian: Шпагин).

This name is also used in submachine guns manufactured in Russian Federation. For example, PP-19 Bizon, PP-93 and PP-2000.

Sources
 Пистолет-пулемёт // Большая Советская Энциклопедия. / под ред. А. М. Прохорова. 3-е изд. том 19. М., «Советская энциклопедия», 1975.
 Пистолет-пулемёт // Советская военная энциклопедия. / ред. Н. В. Огарков. том 6. М., Воениздат, 1978.
 Пистолет-пулемёт // Большая Российская Энциклопедия / редколл., гл. ред. Ю. С. Осипов. том 26. М., научное издательство "Большая Российская Энциклопедия", 2014.

Submachine guns